José Cayetano Juliá Cegarro (born 1 July 1979) is a retired Spanish cyclist. He rode in three Grand Tours in his career, and won stage 16 of the 2004 Vuelta a España to Cáceres, winning from a breakaway. His only other professional career win was the third stage in the 2004 Volta a Portugal.

References

External links

1979 births
Living people
Spanish male cyclists
Spanish Vuelta a España stage winners
People from Cieza, Murcia
Cyclists from the Region of Murcia